The 4 arrondissements of the Marne department are:
 Arrondissement of Châlons-en-Champagne, (prefecture of the Marne department: Châlons-en-Champagne) with 150 communes.  The population of the arrondissement was 109,916 in 2016.  
 Arrondissement of Épernay, (subprefecture: Épernay) with 210 communes.  The population of the arrondissement was 120,269 in 2016.  
 Arrondissement of Reims, (subprefecture: Reims) with 143 communes.  The population of the arrondissement was 294,674 in 2016.  
 Arrondissement of Vitry-le-François, (subprefecture: Vitry-le-François) with 110 communes.  The population of the arrondissement was 46,024 in 2016.

History

In 1800 the arrondissements of Châlons-sur-Marne, Épernay, Reims, Sainte-Menehould and Vitry-le-François were established. The arrondissement of Sainte-Menehould was disbanded in 1926, and restored in 1940. In January 2006 the arrondissement of Épernay absorbed the canton of Ay from the arrondissement of Reims. 

The borders of the arrondissements of Marne were modified in April 2017:
 23 communes from the arrondissement of Châlons-en-Champagne to the arrondissement of Épernay
 two communes from the arrondissement of Châlons-en-Champagne to the arrondissement of Reims
 four communes from the arrondissement of Épernay to the arrondissement of Châlons-en-Champagne
 one commune from the arrondissement of Reims to the arrondissement of Châlons-en-Champagne
 13 communes from the arrondissement of Reims to the arrondissement of Épernay
 all 67 communes of the former arrondissement of Sainte-Menehould to the arrondissement of Châlons-en-Champagne
 three communes from the arrondissement of Vitry-le-François to the arrondissement of Châlons-en-Champagne

References

Marne